Best Dance Video (最優秀ダンスビデオ賞)

Results
The following table displays the nominees and the winners in bold print with a yellow background.

2000s

2010s

See also
MTV Video Music Award for Best Dance Video
MTV Europe Music Award for Best Dance

J

id:MTV Video Music Award japan untuk Best Dance Video